Leucine-rich repeat flightless-interacting protein 1 is a protein that in humans is encoded by the LRRFIP1 gene.

Interactions 

LRRFIP1 has been shown to interact with FLII.

References

Further reading